On 27 June 2014 a massive fire broke out following a blast in Gas Authority of India Limited (GAIL) 18" size underground gas Pipeline at Nagaram in East Godavari district of Andhra Pradesh, India. The accident took place near Tatipaka refinery of Oil and Natural Gas Corporation (ONGC), about 180 km from state capital Vijayawada.

Casualties
About 23 people were reportedly killed and around 40 injured in the accident. The injured were shifted to hospitals at Amalapuram and Kakinada towns.

Accident
State Finance Minister Yanamala Rama Krishnudu told reporters that 22 people were killed and many others were injured when the fire broke out around 5.30 a.m. in Nagaram village in Mamidikuduru Mandal of the coastal district.
The minister said: "The fire caused massive losses. Coconut trees, other crops, cattle, and wild birds in over 10 acres were reduced to ashes."

See also
List of pipeline accidents

References

Explosions in 2014
2014 disasters in India
Pipeline accidents
History of Andhra Pradesh (2014–present)
2010s in Andhra Pradesh
Disasters in Andhra Pradesh
2014 industrial disasters
2014 in the environment
Explosions in India
East Godavari district
Oil and Natural Gas Corporation
June 2014 events in India